Tridé Songtsen, better known by his nickname Sénalek Jingyön or Sadnalegs for short, was the youngest son of King Trisong Detsen of Tibet (reigned  800–815 CE – though various accounts give the beginning of his reign as 797 or 804 CE). 

Trisong Detsen retired to live at Zungkar and handed power to his second son, Muné Tsenpo, in 797. From this point there is much confusion in the various historical sources. It seems there was a struggle for the succession after the death of Trisong Detsen. It is not clear when Trisong Detsen died, or for how long Muné Tsenpo reigned. It is said that Muné Tsenpo was poisoned by his mother, who was jealous of his beautiful wife.

Whatever the case, both the Old Book of Tang and the Tibetan sources agree that, since Muné Tsenpo had no heirs, power passed to his younger brother, Sadnalegs, who was on the throne by 804 CE.

The other brother, Mutik Tsenpo, was apparently not considered for office as he had previously murdered a senior minister and had been banished to Lhodak Kharchu near the Bhutanese border.

Then the powerful Buddhist monk Nyang Tingngezin proposed to install Tridé Songtsen as the new emperor. He was so young that most of ministers doubted about his ability to be the emperor. In order to test the majesty of the young prince, the ministers let him sit on a seat and put many precious ornaments on his head. His body couldn't carry such a weight, so he tilted his neck and wobbled, which was considered very dignified. Finally he inherited the throne, and thus got a nickname, Sénalek Jingyön, which meant "The crooked neck [child] who had been examined and [recognized as] the proper [emperor]".

As he was quite young when he came to the throne, Sadnalegs was assisted by four experienced ministers, two of whom were also Buddhist monks. They followed the policies of the previous kings. Sadnalegs had four wives from different Tibetan clans.

Support for Buddhism

Indian scholars were invited to Samye Monastery to help translate Buddhist texts. Sadnaleg had the temple of Skar-cung (Karchung) built near Lhasa. Due to opposition to Buddhism, the king called a meeting with delegates and vassals from all over the kingdom and drew up a document pledging support for Buddhism which was signed by all who attended. An inscribed pillar with an account of this pledge was erected in front of the Karchung which still exists and has been translated into English.

In 816, he also standardized the literary Tibetan language used in translating the Buddhist scriptures from India, resulting in its transformation into Classical Tibetan.

Political and military activities

Although Tibetan forces were fighting the Chinese between 799 and 803, with battles in Yanzhou (鹽州, present day Yanchi County, Ningxia), Lingzhou (麟州, Zoigê County, Sichuan), Weizhou (維州, Li County, Sichuan), Yazhou (雅州, Ya'an, Sichuan) and Suizhou (巂州, Xichang, Sichuan), envoys began travelling regularly from 804 onwards between Lhasa and China, although no formal treaty was signed. When Emperor Dezong died in 805, Ralpacan sent gifts of gold, silver, cloth, oxen and horses for the funeral.

The Tibetan army continued to attack the Arabs to the west and, according to al-Ya'qubi, they besieged Samarkand, the capital of Transoxiana at the time. Finally, the Tibetan governor of Turkestan presented a statue made of gold and precious stones to the Arab Caliph al-Ma'mun (r. 813–833). This statue was later sent to the Ka'ba in Mecca.

Death and succession

Sadnalegs probably died in 815 (though the Blue Annals give 814). He had five sons, the first became a monk, the last two died in childhood. When Sadnaleg died, Langdarma was bypassed as he was anti-Buddhist and hot tempered and the royal power was given to Ralpacan.

An impressive stone pillar with an inscription commemorating Sadnalegs stand in the burial ground of the Tibetan kings near 'Phyong-rgas. It is partially illegible but confirms a number of historical events. It is of importance in dating Sadnalegs' reign as it states that warfare with China began when he took power. The Tang Annals report that the Chinese and Tibetans were fighting continuously between 799 and 803 CE, so it seems likely that Sadnalegs came to the throne c. 800–804 CE.

References

Tibetan emperors
Buddhist monarchs
9th-century rulers in Asia
8th-century Tibetan people
9th-century Tibetan people
8th-century births
815 deaths
Child monarchs from Asia
Date of birth unknown
8th-century Buddhists
9th-century Buddhists
Language reformers